This is the filmography for American voice actress and voice director Cristina Vee.

Voice acting

Anime

Animation

Film

Video games

Dubbing of foreign shows in English

Other dubbing

Live-action

Television

Film

Other

Notes

References

External links
 
 
 Cristina Valenzuela at Crystal Acids Voice Actor Database
 

Actress filmographies
American filmographies